Stenopodidae is a family of decapods in the order Decapoda. There are about 6 genera and more than 30 described species in Stenopodidae.

Genera
These six genera belong to the family Stenopodidae:
 Juxtastenopus Goy, 2010
 Odontozona Holthuis, 1946
 Richardina A. Milne Edwards, 1881
 Stenopus Latreille, 1819
 † Devonostenopus Jones et al., 2014
 † Phoenice Garassino, 2000

References

Further reading

 
 
 
 

Stenopodidea